David J. Lary (born 7 December 1965) is a British-American atmospheric scientist interested in applying computational and information systems to facilitate discovery and decision support in Earth system science. His main contributions have been to highlight the role of carbonaceous aerosols in atmospheric chemistry, heterogeneous bromine reactions, and to employ chemical data assimilation for satellite validation, and the use of machine learning for remote sensing applications. He is author of AutoChem, NASA release software that constitutes an automatic computer code generator and documentor for chemically reactive systems. It was designed primarily for modeling atmospheric chemistry, and in particular, for chemical data assimilation. He is author of more than 150 publications receiving more than 3,850 citations.

AutoChem has won five NASA awards and has been used to perform long term chemical data assimilation of atmospheric chemistry and in the validation of observations from the NASA Aura satellite. It has been used in numerous peer reviewed articles.
 
David Lary completed his education in the United Kingdom. He received a first class double honors BSc in physics and chemistry from King's College London (1987) with the Sambrooke Exhibition Prize in Natural Science, and a PhD in atmospheric chemistry from the University of Cambridge, Department of Chemistry while at Churchill College (1991). His thesis described the first chemical scheme for the ECMWF numerical weather prediction model. He then held post-doctoral research assistant and associate positions at the University of Cambridge until receiving a Royal Society research fellowship in 1996 (also at Cambridge). From 1998 to 2000 he held a joint position at Cambridge and the University of Tel-Aviv as a senior lecturer and Alon fellow. In 2001 he joined NASA/UMBC/GEST as the first distinguished Goddard fellow in earth science. Between 2001 and 2010 he was part of various branches at NASA Goddard Space Flight Center including the Global Modeling and Assimilation Office, the Atmospheric Chemistry and Dynamics Branch, the Software Integration and Visualization Office, and the Goddard Earth Sciences (GES) Data and Information Services Center (DISC).

In 2010 he moved to the William B. Hanson Center for Space Sciences as a professor of physics at the University of Texas at Dallas, where he has focused on the health effects of atmospheric particulates, and developing a fleet of unmanned aerial vehicles for a variety of agricultural, environmental, and meteorological applications. He is also adjunct Professor in Data Science and Machine Learning at Southern Methodist University, adjunct Professor at Baylor University Center for Astrophysics, Space Physics & Engineering Research, a
Scholar of the Institute for Integrative Health, adjunct Professor at the School of Public Health, University of North Texas Health Science Center, and the departments of Electrical Engineering,  Geographic Information Systems, and Bioengineering  at the University of Texas at Dallas, and a United States Special Operations Command Fellow at SOFWERX by J5, the Futures Mission Directorate. In 2021 David was appointed adjunct Professor of Military/Emergency Medicine at the Uniformed Services University of the Health Sciences, and a UT Dallas Center for Brain Health Investigator.

References

External links
Google Scholar page
ISI publication list
Mendeley publication list
UTD faculty page
Personal page
UTD Mints (His consortium)
Build UAS (Website run by his students)

1965 births
Living people
Alumni of King's College London
Alumni of Churchill College, Cambridge
Atmospheric scientists
21st-century American chemists
British chemists
21st-century American physicists
British physicists
University of Texas at Dallas faculty
Place of birth missing (living people)
Atmospheric chemists
Computational chemists